The cuisine of Devon in England has influenced, and been influenced, by other British cuisine.

Food
As a predominantly rural county with a temperate climate, frequent rains and fertile soils, Devon has for centuries been a net exporter of high quality dairy produce, fresh fruit and vegetables, meat and fish, particularly after the nineteenth-century expansion in the railway network which enabled the fast transport of fresh goods to the cities. This tradition continues, and many food products, such as premium fish and crab landed in Brixham remain highly regarded, particularly in London.

, Devon boasts a Michelin Guide two-starred restaurant at Gidleigh Park and three other one-starred establishments. Several high-profile restaurant owners have relocated to Devon, to take advantage of its high quality produce, including Damien Hirst, Hugh Fearnley-Whittingstall and Mark Hix with a particular cluster in East Devon around Axminster, Ilfracombe and nearby Lyme Regis on the Dorset border. Another gastronomic cluster in the South Hams centred on Totnes, Dartmouth and Modbury, results from these communities pioneering of the Transition Towns concept to develop a sustainable relationship between producer and consumer in the rural economy, while the historic towns of Tavistock, Okehampton and Widecombe-in-the-Moor remain well known for their ancient seasonal markets.

In October 2008, Devon was awarded Fairtrade County status by the Fairtrade Foundation. A monthly county magazine, Devon Life, regularly publishes articles on the food and drink of the county, and the Cornish & Devon Post, a newspaper published in Launceston, also publishes Cornish & Devon Farming Diary and a yearly eating and entertainment guide, Country Cuisine.

Meat and fish

The pasty is as popular in Devon as it is in Cornwall, and the earliest known record for the recipe was from the city of Plymouth in 1510, on the Devon-Cornish border. Naturally, this is one of the principal sources of rivalry between the two counties, which in fact form a cultural continuum across the Westcountry, however pasties made in Devon lack Protected Designation of Origin.

White pudding is a highly spiced pork dish still popular in Devon and Cornwall, where it is known as Hog's pudding; versions are known from the West Midlands, Scotland and elsewhere. A variant version containing oats is known as "Groats pudding" and is found on Dartmoor and parts of Cornwall. Both Dartmoor and Exmoor are well known for their production of wild, free-grazing beef and lamb from regional breeds such as Red Ruby Devon Cattle, South Devon cattle, the Greyface Dartmoor and the Devon Closewool sheep.

Fish and chips also remain particularly popular in the many coastal fishing ports.

In New South Wales, Australia, Devon is a name for luncheon meat (processed ham) but is unknown in England. The name changes in different states of Australia (for example, 'Fritz' in South Australia, 'Polony' in Western Australia) but all describe the same type of meat.

Dairy produce
The county has given its name to a number of culinary specialities. The Devonshire cream tea, involving scones or rather Devonshire Splits, jam and clotted cream is considered to have originated in Devon (though claims have also been made for neighbouring counties); in other countries however, such as Australia and New Zealand, it is known as a "Devonshire tea".

Ice cream is also made by many Devon creameries and is known for its luxurious rich full cream taste. Typical flavours may include summer berries such as brambles or blackcurrant and a local favourite is 'thunder and lightning' made with sugar honeycomb and golden syrup. Ice cream is also often served with additional Devon clotted cream which changes texture when frozen.

Curworthy, Sharpham and Vulscombe cheeses are all made in Devon. Devon Blue and Beenleigh Blue are made at a dairy on the Sharpham Estate. Devon Blue won an award for the best English cheese in 2011.

The Ambrosia creamery with its famous tagline "Devon knows how they make it so creamy", best known for its custard and creamed rice pudding has been based in the village of Lifton since 1917.
Junket is a dairy foodstuff known historically as the food of courting lovers and the base product of the initial stage of the cheesemaking process. It can occasionally still be found on traditional menus.
Fudge, often made with Devon clotted cream, can be found all over Devon.

Fruit and vegetables
{{rquote|right|The way in 'which potatoes are served in Devonshire to breakfast is an excellent measure for supplying fat to the organism in a very palatable form. The potatoes having been boiled are placed in the frying-pan along with a liberal supply of bacon fat. They are then chopped small while heating,- and kept in the pan till the outside is browned.|p 319, North Carolina Medical Journal, Volumes 19-20, 1887.}}

Potatoes feature prominently after presumably having been introduced to Devon and the rest of Europe by Sir Walter Raleigh of East Budleigh, they formed a major part of the peasant diet in the nineteenth century. An example dish is Homity pie, which traditionally is made with potatoes, onions and leeks.

An exceptional number of traditional varieties of apple are specific to Devon's ancient orchards, which shares a history of cider production with its Westcountry neighbours along with rare varieties of many other fruits including the Dittisham plum, a dessert variety grown there.

The Tamar Valley was historically famous for its early season production of soft fruits in its sheltered south-facing valleys which were exported to London by rail. Today, Riverford distributes its produce via an organic box scheme across the whole of the UK and is the UK's largest organic veg box scheme.

Drinks
Cider, known as 'Cyder' or 'Scrumpy' is the traditional drink of Devon as it was in much of the Westcountry, peasants often paid an allowance of three pints per day. One of the most famous cider producers of the 20th century was Whiteways of Whimple, East Devon. They produced many internationally famous ciders and also some non-alcoholic variants including Cydrax and Peardrax. During Whiteway's heyday they boasted the largest cyder orchards in Britain. There is now a Whiteways museum and heritage centre next to the New Fountain Inn in the village of Whimple. Three Hammers is a brand of strong white cider made in Tiverton by the Devon Cider Company. There are still a large number of cider producers in Devon

The Heavitree Brewery was a local brewer, located in Heavitree; its history can be traced back to 1790. It was the last brewery in Exeter to cease production, continuing until 1970, the brewery buildings were demolished in 1980. The name continues in use as the owner of a chain of pubs in south west England, and Heavitree Brewery PLC continues as a quoted company with its address in Exeter.

The Plymouth Gin Distillery has been producing Plymouth Gin since 1793, which was exported around the world by the Royal Navy. During the 1930s, it was the most widely distributed gin and has a controlled term of origin.

There are now a number of vineyards in Devon producing white wines, the oldest being Yearlstone Vineyard which was started in 1976 at Bickleigh in the valley of the River Exe. Others include Sharpham Vineyard, near Totnes, and Pebblebed Vineyard near Topsham. The monks of Buckfast Abbey still produce Buckfast Tonic Wine which has attracted an unlikely down-market cult status in Scotland.

Devon has a strong association with the old Westcountry tradition of alcoholic cordials such as Lovage, Grenadine and Shrub. These traditional drinks and mixers are still produced today by J R Phillips of Bristol.

See also
 Cornish cuisine
 Cuisine of Dorset

References

Further reading
Clark, Philippa, comp. (1968) Exeter Cooking: a collection of recipes''. Exeter: [the compiler] (includes a few from other countries and a few for drinks)

Culture in Devon
Devonshire cuisine